Pau Franch Franch (born 25 July 1988 in Betxí, Castellón, Valencian Community) is a Spanish professional footballer who plays as a striker.

References

External links

1988 births
Living people
People from Plana Baixa
Sportspeople from the Province of Castellón
Spanish footballers
Footballers from the Valencian Community
Association football forwards
Segunda División players
Segunda División B players
Tercera División players
CD Castellón footballers
CD Alcoyano footballers
CD Dénia footballers
CD Olímpic de Xàtiva footballers
Lorca FC players
Arandina CF players
CD Tudelano footballers
UD Socuéllamos players
Atlético Saguntino players
San Fernando CD players